Paul Alford is a former Canadian football guard and running back who played for the Edmonton Eskimos and Calgary Stampeders of the Canadian Football League. Alford played in 24 regular season games from 1950 to 1952.

After an inactive season, he joined the Ottawa Rough Riders in 1955.

References 

Canadian football guards
Canadian football running backs
Hamilton Wildcats football players
Hamilton Tigers football players
Edmonton Elks players
Calgary Stampeders players
Ottawa Rough Riders players
Possibly living people
Year of birth missing